Ralfinamide (INN) (code names NW-1029, FCE-26742A, PNU-0154339E) is a multimodal drug which is under investigation by Newron Pharmaceuticals for the treatment of neuropathic pain and other pain conditions such as post-operative dental pain.

It has a relatively complex pharmacology, acting as a mixed voltage-gated sodium channel blocker (including Nav1.7), N-type calcium channel blocker, noncompetitive NMDA receptor antagonist, and monoamine oxidase B inhibitor.

It has thus far progressed as far as phase IIb/phase III clinical trials. In 2010 it failed a phase II trial for lower back pain. Encouraging Phase II results have been announced for neuropathic pain.

See also
 List of investigational analgesics
 Safinamide, different fluorine position
 Evenamide, structurally-related antipsychotic in development
 Lacosamide, used for partial-onset seizures and diabetic neuropathic pain
 Ziconotide, FDA approved peptide for chronic  neuropathic pain

References

External links
 Ralfinamide - Newron Pharmaceuticals

Carboxamides
Analgesics
Calcium channel blockers
Monoamine oxidase inhibitors
NMDA receptor antagonists
Fluoroarenes
Sodium channel blockers
Experimental drugs